Van Blarcom House, is located in Franklin Lakes, Bergen County, New Jersey, United States. The house was built in 1770 and was added to the National Register of Historic Places on July 24, 1984.

See also
National Register of Historic Places listings in Bergen County, New Jersey

References

Franklin Lakes, New Jersey
Houses on the National Register of Historic Places in New Jersey
Houses completed in 1770
Houses in Bergen County, New Jersey
National Register of Historic Places in Bergen County, New Jersey
New Jersey Register of Historic Places
1770 establishments in New Jersey